Talat Hussain Warsi, is a Pakistani actor. He is the son of Altaf Hussain Warsi and Shaista Begum who was one of the pioneering voices of Radio Pakistan, Karachi.

Career
Hussain has worked in several foreign films, television drama serials and long plays, including Channel Four's television serial Traffik and Family Pride. In 2006, Hussain won the Amanda Award for the Best Supporting Role in Norwegian film  Import-export (2005). He also worked in the Indian film Sautan Ki Beti and made a guest appearance in Jinnah (1998 film).

Talat Hussain's career has been recorded by the author Huma Mir in the book Yeh Hain Talat Hussain. In 2014, Tributes were paid to him at an event at the Arts Council of Pakistan, Karachi by many television personalities including playwright Haseena Moin, veteran TV actor/playwright of Alif Noon (1982) fame, Kamal Ahmed Rizvi, journalist Mazhar Abbas and veteran TV actor Qazi Wajid.

Personal life
Hussain is married to Rakhshanda Hussain, a professor of psychology at the University of Karachi. They have three children, two daughters and one son : Tazeen, the eldest daughter, was a television actress before quitting after her wedding, the younger daughter, Roohaina, has a few television plays to her credit, while the son is working at a multinational company after doing an MBA degree and is interested in film-making.

In 2012, he is  a faculty member at the National Academy of Performing Arts (NAPA) in Karachi where he teaches acting. 

In February 2012, in an interview to a major English-language newspaper of Pakistan, Talat Hussain revealed that he caught a skin allergy in 2010. This skin allergy developed complications due to wrong treatment by a local cosmetologist. "I couldn't even talk properly, let alone walk or sit after the treatment." His hands trembled and it was difficult for him to hold a teacup and light his cigarette back in 2012.

Television

Films
 Chiragh Jalta Raha (1962 film)
 Ishara (A 1969 film - written, produced and directed by Waheed Murad)
 Malkoçoğlu Ölüm Fedaileri (1971)
 Gumnaam (1983 film) (1983)
 Ek Say Barh Kar Ek (1987)
 Import-eksport (2005 Norwegian film)
 Insan aur Aadmi
 Jinnah - The Movie (1998)
 Laaj (2003)
 Qurbani (1981 film)
 Kamyabi  (1984)
 Sautan Ki Beti (Indian film)
 Bandagi
 Mohabbat Mar Nahi Sakti
 Actor in Law (2016)
 Chupan Chupai (2017)
 Project Ghazi (2017)

Stage 
 Andhera Ujala
 Raz o Niaz
 Guriya Ghar
 Lao Tau Qatalnama Mera
 Sufaid Khoon
 Khalid Ki Khala
 Jo Chalay To Jaan Sey Guzar Gayey

Awards and nominations
 Sitara-i-Imtiaz (Star of Excellence) Award by the President of Pakistan in 2021.
 Pride of Performance Award (1982).
  Best Actor Gumnan, National Film Awards (1985).
 Amanda Award (2006) Best Supporting Actor in Norwegian film – Import Eksport (2005).
 The 1st Indus Drama Awards (2005) Nominee: Best Actor Drama Series in a Leading Role.
 Nigar Award in 1986 for Best Supporting Actor in film Miss Bangkok (1986)

Lux Style Awards

See also
 National Academy of Performing Arts
 List of Lollywood actors

References

External links
 

1945 births
Living people
Muhajir people
Pakistani male film actors
Pakistani male television actors
Pakistani male stage actors
Recipients of the Pride of Performance
Recipients of Sitara-i-Imtiaz
Alumni of the London Academy of Music and Dramatic Art
Nigar Award winners
Male actors from Karachi
Pakistani male radio actors
Radio personalities from Karachi
Hum Award winners